The Ironman World Championship is an ultra-triathlon held annually in Hawaii, United States since 1978, with an additional race in 1982. It is owned and organized by the World Triathlon Corporation. It is the annual culmination of a series of Ironman triathlon qualification races held throughout the world.

History
From 1978 through 1980 the race was held on the island of Oahu, the course combining that of three events already held there: the Waikiki Roughwater Swim (2.4 mi./3.86 km), the Around-Oahu Bike Race (115 mi./185.07 km, originally a two-day event), and the Honolulu Marathon. The bike stage was reduced by 3 miles to link it to the start of the marathon course. In 1981 the race was moved to the less urbanized Big Island, keeping the distances the same: a  open water swim in Kailua-Kona Bay, a  bike ride across the Hawaiian lava desert to Hāwī and back, and a marathon (26 miles 385 yards, 42.195 km) run along the coast of the Big Island from Keauhou to Keahole Point and back to Kailua-Kona, finishing on Alii Drive.

Since 1982, the race has been held in the fall each year, before which it was held in the spring, giving two races in 1982. The most recent Ironman World Championship took place on 8 October 2022, following a two-year hiatus due to the COVID-19 pandemic. Qualifying for the World Championship is achieved through placement in one of the other Ironman races or some Ironman 70.3 races. Because of COVID-19, the 2020 race was initially postponed to February 2021. However, the race was ultimately canceled with that year's qualifiers able to defer to race in 2021 or 2022.

The current Ironman Hawaii course record was set in 2022 by Gustav Iden (Norway), whose winning time was 7 hrs 40 min 24 sec. The women's course record is 8 hrs 26 mins 18 sec, set in 2018 by Daniela Ryf (Switzerland).

Athletes with disabilities compete in the event in the physically challenged category, which was instituted in 1997, and are required to meet the same cutoff times as able bodied competitors. Australian John Maclean was the first physically challenged athlete to complete the event under the cut-off time.

Course records

Men

Women

Medalists

Men

20: 
10: 
7: 
3:   
2: 
‡The 2021 World Championship was held in St. George, Utah on May 7, 2022. The delay and change from the original Kona, Hawaii venue were due to the COVID-19 pandemic.

Women

11: 
9: 
7: 
5:   
4: 
2: 
1: 
†Paula Newby Fraser was a citizen and represented the United States for the 1996 race

‡The 2021 World Championship was held in St. George, Utah on May 7, 2022. The delay and change from the original Kona, Hawaii venue were due to the COVID-19 pandemic.

Ironman lottery
Until 2015, individuals could enter a lottery for the chance to participate in the Ironman World Championship. The lottery entry fee was $50 and afforded the chance to win one of 100 berths in the championship race. If selected the winners then had to pay the normal entry fee.

However, according to a sworn complaint filed with the U.S. District Court in Tampa, Florida, Ironman illegally charged athletes for a chance to win the opportunity to compete in the Ironman World Championship. According to Florida law, the state where the World Triathlon Corporation resides, it is illegal to set up and charge for a lottery. Because WTC charged a $50 fee to enter the lottery, instead of giving away the opportunity to win a slot at the championships, they were in violation of this law. Following the complaint WTC cooperated with the United States Attorneys office and the FBI's investigation of the matter and agreed to forfeit $2,761,910, the amount collected from the lottery since October 24, 2012. The attorney representing the United States in the matter was 8-time Ironman finisher James A. Muench. 

Winners of the 2015 lottery were notified on March 17, 2015, prior to the announcement of the complaint. WTC stated that these winners would be unaffected by this decision and that their slots for the upcoming championship race would be honored.

References

Citations

Sources

External links

Ironman.com
Ironman Hawaii - Triathlon All-Time Rankings Men Masters 
Ironman Hawaii - Triathlon All-Time Rankings Women Masters 

 
Triathlon world championships
Ironman Triathlon
Tourist attractions in Hawaii County, Hawaii
Recurring sporting events established in 1978
Sports competitions in Hawaii
Kailua-Kona, Hawaii
Annual sporting events
1978 establishments in Hawaii
Annual sporting events in the United States
Multisports in the United States
Hawaii culture